Elisa Godínez Gómez de Batista (c. 1905 – June 19, 1993) was the First Lady of Cuba from 1940 to 1944. She was the first wife of Cuban  President, Dictator Fulgencio Batista.

Biography
Godínez was born on December 2, 1904 in the village of Vereda Nueva in the Havana province (Ciudad de La Habana Province). Like Batista, she was of humble origin and was born in a small farmhouse, as one of nine children born to Salustiano Godínez y Córdoba and Concepción Gómez y Acosta. 

Godinez married Batista in 1933. They had a son, Rubén, and two daughters, Mirta and Elisa Aleida. They divorced in 1945.

Godínez married her second husband, Máximo Rodríguez, a former member of the Cuban Congress, and they immigrated to the United States in 1959, settling in Miami, Florida. Rodríguez died in 1962, and Godínez resided in Miami until her death there on June 19, 1993, at age 88.

One of her grandsons (the son of Elisa Batista) is Raoul G. Cantero III, a Justice of the Florida Supreme Court from 2002 to 2008.

References

Further reading
Fulgencio Batista: From Revolutionary to Strongman by Frank Argote-Freyre; Rutgers University Press (2006); 

1900s births
1993 deaths
People from Havana
People from Miami
Exiles of the Cuban Revolution in the United States
First ladies of Cuba
Cuban Roman Catholics